Gustavo is the Latinate form of a Germanic male given name with respective prevalence in Portuguese, Spanish, and Italian. It has been a common name for Swedish monarchs since the reign of Gustav Vasa.

It is derived from Gustav /ˈɡʊstɑːv/, also spelled Gustaf, of Old Swedish origin, meaning “staff of the Gods/Goths” or “great royal staff” or "staff of the Geats", derived from the Old Norse elements Gautr ("Geat") and stafr ("staff").

People with the name
Brazil has the highest count, over half a million, of people bearing the name. 

Mexico and Argentina follows, each having over a quarter million count. 

Uruguay, a nation between Argentina and Brazil, has the highest density of people bearing the name.

Drama, film and television 
 Gustavo Alatriste, Mexican actor, director, and producer of films, married to Silvia Pinal
 Gustavo Aguerre (born 1953), Argentine artist, curator, writer, and theatre designer
 Gustavo Sorola, American actor, podcast host, and co-founder of the American company, Rooster Teeth

Engineering, religion and science 
 Gustavo Colonnetti (1886–1968), Italian mathematician and engineer
 Gustavo Gutiérrez Merino (born 1928), Peruvian theologian and Dominican priest regarded as the founder of Liberation Theology at the University of Notre Dame
 Gustavo Tamayo, Colombian ophthalmologist
 Gustavo Marín, Chilean-French economist and sociologist
 Gustavo Scuseria (born 1956), Robert A. Welch Professor of Chemistry, Professor of Physics & Astronomy and Professor of Materials Science & NanoEngineering at Rice University

Music 
 Gustavo Angel (born 1968), Mexican singer of Los Temerarios
 Gustavo Assis-Brasil, Brazilian jazz guitarist
Gustavo Becerra-Schmidt (born 1925), Chilean composer
Gustavs Butelis (born 1978), Latvian rapper and producer known professionally as Gustavo
 Gustavo Gonzalez, also known as Big Duke, member of American hip-hop group Psycho Realm
 Gustavo Cerati (1959-2014), Argentine artist and songwriter
 Gustavo Cordera (born 1964), Argentine rock musician
 Gustavo Dudamel (born 1981), Venezuelan conductor
 Gustavo Lapis Ahumad, founding member of American goth rock band Bitter Grace
 Gustavo Ramírez Reyes, Mexican musician and composer
 Gustavo Santander, Colombian composer
 Gustavo Santaolalla (born 1952), Argentine musician, producer, and composer
 Gusttavo Lima (born 1989), Brazilian singer, song writer and record producer

Military and politics 
 Gustavo A. Madero (1875–1913), participant in the Mexican Revolution
 Gustavo Adolfo Espina Salguero (born c.1946), former vice-president of Guatemala
 Gustavo Arcos Bergnes (1926–2006), Cuban revolutionary alongside Fidel Castro
 Gustavo Díaz Ordaz Bolaños Cacho (1911–1979), former President of Mexico
 Gustavo Espinoza, Peruvian politician and Congressman
 Gustavo Esteva, Mexican activist who founded the Universidad de la Tierra in Oaxaca, Mexico
 Gustavo Jiménez (c.1886–1933), Peruvian Colonel who served as President of Peru for six days
 Gustavo Leigh Guzmán (1920–1999), representative of the Air Force in the Government Junta that ruled Chile
 Gustavo Noboa Bejarano (born 1937), politician and former President of Ecuador
 Gustavo Petricioli (born 1928), Mexican economist and ambassador to the United States
 Gustavo Rojas Pinilla (1900–1975), former military dictator and Colombian political figure
 Gustavo Vázquez Montes (1962–2005), Mexican politician of the PRI, governor of Colima
 , a Spanish politician and diplomat
 Carlos Gustavo dos Anjos, São Toméan diplomat and Foreign Minister

Sports 
 Gustavo Adrián López (born 1973), Argentine footballer
 Gustavo Andrés Oberman (born 1985), Argentine footballer
 Gustavo Ayón, Mexican basketball player
 Gustavo Badell (born 1972), Venezuelan IFBB professional bodybuilder
 Gustavo Barros Schelotto, Argentine footballer
 Gustavo Benítez (born 1953), Paraguayan football defender and manager
 Gustavo Boccoli (born 1978), Brazilian footballer
 Gustavo Borges (born 1972), Brazilian swimmer
 Gustavo Cabrera (born 1979), Guatemalan footballer
 Gustavo Chacín (born 1980), starting pitcher in Major League Baseball
 Gustavo Santos Costa (born 1996), Brazilian footballer for Hồ Chí Minh City F.C.
 Gustavo Dezotti, Argentine football striker
 Gustavo Endres, Brazilian volleyball player
 Gustavo Enrique García (born 1980), Mexican footballer
 Gustavo Gómez (born 1993), Paraguayan footballer
 Gustavo Kuerten (born 1976), Brazilian tennis player
 Gustavo Marzi (1908–1966), Italian fencer
 Gustavo Manduca (born 1980), Brazilian footballer
 Gustavo Méndez (born 1971), Uruguayan footballer
 Gustavo Méndez (referee) (born 1967), Uruguayan football (soccer) referee
 Gustavo Morínigo (born 1977), Paraguayan football midfielder
 Gustavo Munúa (born 1978), Uruguayan football goalkeeper
 Gustavo Nascimento da Costa (born 1995), Brazilian footballer
 Gustavo Nery (born 1977), Brazilian footballer
 Gustavo Oliveros (born 1946), Cuban fencer
 Gustavo Lobo Paradeda (born 1979), Brazilian-born Russian futsal player
 Gustavo Poyet (born 1967), Uruguayan footballer
 Gustavo Pereira (born 1997), Brazilian footballer for Retrô
 Gustavo Quinteros Desabato (born 1965), Bolivian football player and coach
 Gustavo Salgueiro de Almeida Correia (born 1985), Brazilian footballer
 Gustavo Sant'Ana Santos (born 1995), Brazilian footballer for Sài Gòn
 Gustavo Claudio da Silva (born 1988), Brazilian footballer for Nakhon Si United
 Gustavo Valderrama (born 1977), Venezuelan volleyball player
 Gustavo Varela (born 1978), Uruguayan footballer
 Luis Gustavo Dias (born 1987), Brazilian footballer
 Arthur Gustavo Malzahn III (born 1965), American Football coach

Writing 
 Gustavo Adolfo Bécquer (1836–1870), Spanish writer of poetry and short stories
 Gustavo Adolfo Martínez Zuviría (1883–1962), novelist and scriptwriter from Argentina
 Gustavo Adolfo Mellander (born 1935), Swedish-Panamanian writer, professor, college president, and historian
 Gustavo Pérez Firmat (born 1949), Cuban-American writer, poet, professor
 Gustavo Gorriti, Peruvian journalist
 Gustavo Sainz (born 1940), Spanish language author from Mexico

Other professions 
 Gustavo C. Garcia (1915–1964), American civil rights attorney and advocate
 Gustavo Charif (born 1966), Argentine artist
 Gustavo Cisneros (born 1946), Venezuelan-born media mogul
 Gustavo Franco, former President of the Brazilian Central Bank Bank
 Gustavo Gianetti (born 1979), Brazilian model, Mister World 2003
 Gustavo Martínez Zuviría, de facto Federal Interventor of Córdoba, Argentina
 Gustavo Rol (1903–1994), Italian sensitive
 Gustavo R. Vincenti (1888–1974), Maltese architect and developer

Fictional characters 
 Gustavo, in the video game Uncharted 4: A Thief's End
 Gustavo, in the children's animated series Thomas & Friends
Gustavo Fring, in the American television drama series Breaking Bad on AMC
 Gustavo Rocque, on the show Big Time Rush
 Dr. Gustavo Bauer, in Season 6, Episode 16 (Room 147) of the ABC television drama series Castle
 Gustavo Borracha, major antagonist in Maintenance.

See also 
 Gustavo A. Madero, Mexico City, a municipality
 Licenciado Gustavo Díaz Ordaz International Airport, at Puerto Vallarta, Jalisco
 Gustavo Rojas Pinilla International Airport, on San Andres Island, Colombia

Masculine given names
Italian masculine given names
Spanish masculine given names
Portuguese masculine given names

es:Gustavo
pt:Gustavo